Mali is located in Africa.
The history of the territory of modern Mali may be divided into:
Pre-Imperial Mali, before the 13th century
The history of the eponymous Mali Empire and of the Songhai Empire during the 13th to 16th centuries

The borders of Mali are those of French Sudan, drawn in 1891. They are artificial, and unite parts of the larger Sudan region with parts of the Sahara.
As a consequence, Mali is a multiethnic country, with a majority of its population consisting of Mandé peoples.

Mali's history is dominated by its role in trans-Saharan trade, connecting West Africa and the Maghreb. The Malian city Timbuktu is exemplary of this: situated on the southern fringe of the Sahara and close to the Niger River, it has played an important role in the trans-Saharan trade from the 13th century on, with the establishment of the Mali Empire.

Prehistory

Paleolithic

The Sahara was often drier, but also more rainy for a long time than it is today. Hence, it was a place uninhabitable for humans 325,000 to 290,000 years ago and 280,000 to 225,000 years ago, apart from favorable places like the Tihodaïne lake on the water-storing Tassili n'Ajjer. In these and other dry periods, the desert stretched repeatedly far to the north and south; its sand dunes can be found far beyond the present-day borders of the Sahara. Human traces can only be expected in the rainier green phases. It is possible that anatomically modern humans, which perhaps developed in the said isolated phase 300,000 to 200,000 years ago south of the Sahara, already in the long green phase over 200,000 years ago the water-rich area at that time. Even around 125,000 to 110,000 years ago there was an adequate network of waterways that allowed numerous animal species to spread northward, followed by human hunters. Huge lakes contributed to this, such as the Mega Lake Chad, which at times covered over 360,000 km2. On the other hand, the desert stretched far north and south again 70,000 to 58,000 years ago and is therefore likely to have represented a barrier that was difficult to overcome. Another green phase followed 50,000 to 45,000 years ago.

In Mali the find situation is less favorable than in the northern neighbors. Excavations at the Ounjougou complex   on the Dogon Plateau near Bandiagara have shown that hunters and gatherers lived in the region more than 150,000 years ago. Dating back to between 70,000 and 25,000 years ago is certain. The Paleolithic ended very early in Mali because after this section 25,000 to 20,000 years ago there was another extreme dry phase, the Ogolia. When towards the end of the savannah landscape.

Neolithic
 
After the end of the last maximum expansion of the northern ice masses towards the end of the last glacial period, the climate was characterized by much higher humidity than it is today. The Niger created a huge inland lake in the area around Timbuktu and Araouane, as well as a similarly large lake in Chad. At the same time, savannah landscapes and a landscape in northern Mali comparable to that which characterizes the south today. This around 9500 BC The humid phase that began after the Younger Dryas period, a cold period after the last glacial period, was around 5000 BC. Chr. Increasingly replaced by an increasingly dry phase.

The Neolithic, the time in which people increasingly produced their own food instead of hunting, fishing or collecting it as before, developed during this humid phase. This is usually divided into three sections, which are separated from each other by distinct dry phases. Sorghum and millet were planted and around 8000 BC. Large herds of cattle that were close to the zebus grazed in what is now the Sahara; Sheep and goats were not added until much later from West Asia, while cattle were first domesticated in Africa.

Ceramics appeared at the central Malian site of Ounjougou dating to about 9,400 BC, and are believed to be an instance of the independent invention of pottery.
ie 9500 to 7000 v. BC, in the Aïr according to Marianne Cornevin as early as 10,000 BC. Chr. [8] The earliest Neolithic is attributed to the phase of the productive way of life, although no plants were cultivated and no cattle were kept. In Mali, the Ravin de la Mouche site, which belongs here, was dated to an age of 11,400–10,200 years. [9] This site belongs to the Ounjougou complex on the Yamé, where all eras since the Upper Paleolithic Have left traces [10] and the oldest ceramics in Mali to 9400 BC. Was dated. In Ravin de la Mouche, artifacts could date between 9500 and 8500 BC. The site Ravin du Hibou 2 can be dated to 8000 to 7000 BC. Thereafter, where the said oldest ceramic remains were found in the course of a research program that has been running since 1997 in the two gorges, a hiatus between 7000 and 3500 BC occurred . BC because the climate was too unfavorable - even for hunters and gatherers.

The middle Neolithic of the Dogon Plateau can be recognized by gray, bifacial stone tools made from quartzite . The first traces of nomadic cattle breeders can be found (again) around 4000 BC. BC, whereby it was around 3500 BC. The relatively humid climate came to an end. [11] Excavations in Karkarichinkat (2500–1600 BC) and possibly in Village de la Frontière (3590 cal BC) prove this, as do studies on Lake Fati . The latter consisted continuously between 10,430 and 4660 BPas evidenced by layers of mud on its eastern edge. A 16 cm thick layer of sand was dated around 4500 BP, which provided evidence that the region dried out around 1000 years later than on the Mauritanian coast. [12] A thousand years later, the dry phase, which apparently drove cattle nomads from the east to Mali, reached its peak. The northern lakes dried up and the population mostly moved south. The transition from the Neolithic to the Pre-Dogon is still unclear. In Karkarichinkat it became apparent that sheep, cattle and goats were kept, but hunting, gathering and fishing continued to play an important role. It may even be the case that successful pastoralism prevented agriculture from establishing itself for a long time.[13]

The late Neolithic was marked by renewed immigration from the Sahara around 2500 BC. Chr., Which had grown into an enormously spacious desert. This aridization continued and forced further migrations to the south, the approximate course of which is archaeologically understandable. On the basis of ethno-archaeological studies of ceramics, three groups were found that lived around Méma, the Canal de Sonni Ali and Windé Koroji on the border with Mauritania in the period around 2000 BC. Lived. This was made possible by ceramic research at the Kobadi site (1700 to 1400 BC), the MN25 site near Hassi el Abiod and Kirkissoy near Niameyin Niger (1500 to 1000 BC). Apparently the two groups hiked towards Kirkissoy last. [14] No later than the 2nd half of the 2nd millennium BC. Millet cultivation reached the region at the Varves Ouest site, more precisely the cultivation of pearl millet (Pennisetum glaucum), but also wheat and emmer, which were established much earlier in the east of the Sahara, now (again?) Reached Mali. Ecological changes indicate that tillage must have started as early as the 3rd millennium. [15] But this phase of agriculture ended around 400 BC. In turn by an extreme drought.

The use of ocher in funerals was common up to the 1st millennium, even with animals, as the spectacular find of a horse in the west of the inland delta, in Tell Natamatao (6 km from Thial in the Cercle Tenenkou) shows, whose bones are included Ocher had been sprinkled. [16] There are also rock carvings typical of the entire Sahara, in which not only symbols and depictions of animals but also depictions of people appear. From the 1st millennium BC Paintings in the Boucle-du-Baoulé National Park (Fanfannyégèné), on the Dogon Plateau and in the Niger River Delta (Aire Soroba). [17]

In Karkarichikat Nord (KN05) and Karkarichinkat Sud (KS05) in the lower Tilemsi Valley, a fossil river valley 70 km north of Gao, it was possible to prove for the first time in eleven women in West Africa south of the Sahara that the modification of the teeth for ritual reasons was also there was in use around 4500-4200 BP, similar to the Maghreb . [18] In contrast to men, women have modifications ranging from extractions to filings, so that the teeth are given a pointed shape. A custom that lasted until the 19th century. [19]

It was also found there that the inhabitants of the valley already obtained 85% of their carbon intake from grass seeds, mainly from C4 plants ; this happened either through the consumption of wild plants, such as the wild millet, or through domesticated lamp-cleaning grasses . [20] This provided the earliest evidence of agricultural activity and cattle breeding in West Africa (around 2200 cal BP). [21]

The sites of the Dhar Tichitt tradition in the Méma region, a former river delta west of today's inland delta, also known as the "dead delta", [22] belong to the period between 1800 and 800/400 BC. Chr. Their settlements measured between one and eight hectares, but the settlement was not continuous, which may be related to the fact that this region was not suitable for cattle farming during the rainy season. The reason for this was the tsetse fly, which prevented this way of life from expanding southwards for a long time.

In contrast to these cattle breeders, who then drove their herds northwards again, the members of the simultaneous Kobadi tradition, who had lived exclusively from fishing, collecting wild grasses and hunting since the middle of the 2nd millennium at the latest, remained relatively stationary. Both cultures had copper that they brought from Mauritania . At the same time, the different cultures cultivated a lively exchange. [23]

Earlier Iron Age
A series of early cities and towns were created by Mande peoples related to the Soninke people, along the middle Niger River (in Mali) including at Dia which began from around 900 BC, and reached its peak around 600 BC, and at Djenné-Djenno, which was occupied from around 250 B.C to around 800 AD. Djenné-Djenno comprised an urban complex consisting of 40 mounds within a 4 kilometer radius.   
The site is believed to exceed 33 hectares (82 acres), and the town engaged in both local and long-distance trade During Djenné-Djenno's second phase (during the first millennium AD) the borders of the site expanded during (possibly covering 100,000 square meters or more), also coinciding with the development at the site of a kind of permanent mud brick architecture, including a city wall, probably built during the latter half of the first millennium AD using the cylindrical brick technology, "which was 3.7 meters wide at its base and ran almost two kilometers around the town".<ref>Shaw, Thurstan. "The Archaeology of Africa: Food, Metals and Towns. Routledge, 1993, pp. 632.</ref>

There are a few references to Mali in early Islamic literature. Among these are references to "Pene" and "Malal" in the work of al-Bakri in 1068, the story of the conversion of an early ruler, known to Ibn Khaldun (by 1397) as Barmandana, and a few geographical details in the work of al-Idrisi.

Ghana Empire

Mali Empire
The Mali Empire was the largest empire in West Africa and profoundly influenced the culture of West Africa through the spread of its language, laws and customs.

Until the 19th century, Timbuktu remained important as an outpost at the southwestern fringe of the Muslim world and a hub of the trans-Saharan slave trade.

Mandinka from c. 1230 to c. 1600. The empire was founded by Sundiata Keita and became known for the wealth of its rulers, especially Mansa Musa I. The Mali Empire had many profound cultural influences on West Africa, allowing the spread of its language, laws and customs along the Niger River. It extended over a large area and consisted of numerous vassal kingdoms and provinces.

The Mali Empire began to weaken in the 15th century, but it remained dominant for much of the 15th. It survived into the 16th century, but by then had lost much of its former strength and importance.

Songhai Empire

The Mali Empire began to weaken by the mid 14th century. The Songhai took advantage of this and asserted their independence. The Songhai made Gao their capital and began an imperial expansion of their own throughout the western Sahel. And by 1420, Songhai was strong enough to exact tribute from Masina. The emerging Songhai Empire and the declining Mali Empire co-existed during much of the later 14th and throughout the 15th century. In the later 15th century, control of Timbuktu shifted to the Songhai Empire. There was a prophecy during this time that in the 21st century there would be a born heir.

 After the empires (1591–1892) 

The Songhai empire eventually collapsed under the pressure from the Moroccan Saadi dynasty. The turning point was the Battle of Tondibi of 13 March 1591. Morocco subsequently controlled Gao, Timbuktu, Djenné (also seen as Jenne), and related trade routes with much difficulty until around the end of the 17th century.

After the collapse of the Songhai Empire, no single state-controlled the region. The Moroccans only succeeded in occupying a few portions of the country, and even in those locations where they did attempt to rule, their hold was weak and challenged by rivals. Several small successor kingdoms arose. The most notable in what is now Mali were:

 Bambara Empire or the Kingdom of Segou 

The Bambara Empire existed as a centralized state from 1712 to 1861, was based at Ségou and also Timbuktu (also seen as Segu), and ruled parts of central and southern Mali. It existed until El Hadj Umar Tall, a Toucouleur conqueror swept across West Africa from Futa Tooro. Umar Tall's mujahideen readily defeated the Bambara, seizing Ségou itself on March 10, 1861, and declaring an end to the empire.

 Kingdom of Kaarta 

A split in the Coulibaly dynasty in Ségou led to the establishment of a second Bambara state, the kingdom of Kaarta, in what is now western Mali, in 1753. It was defeated in 1854 by Umar Tall, leader of Toucouleur Empire, before his war with Ségou.

 Kenedougou Kingdom 

The Senufo Kenedugu Kingdom originated in the 17th century in the area around what is now the border of Mali and Burkina Faso. In 1876 the capital was moved to Sikasso. It resisted the effort of Samori Ture, leader of Wassoulou Empire, in 1887, to conquer it, and was one of the last kingdoms in the area to fall to the French in 1898.

 Maasina 

An Islamic-inspired uprising in the largely Fula Inner Niger Delta region against rule by Ségou in 1818 led to the establishment of a separate state. It later allied with Bambara Empire against Umar Tall's Toucouleur Empire and was also defeated by it in 1862.

 Toucouleur Empire 

This empire, founded by El Hadj Umar Tall of the Toucouleur peoples, beginning in 1864, ruled eventually most of what is now Mali until the French conquest of the region in 1890. This was in some ways a turbulent period, with ongoing resistance in Messina and increasing pressure from the French.

 Wassoulou Empire 

The Wassoulou or Wassulu Empire was a short-lived (1878–1898) empire, led by Samori Ture in the predominantly Malinké area of what is now upper Guinea and southwestern Mali (Wassoulou). It later moved to Ivory Coast before being conquered by the French.

 French Sudan (1892–1960) 

Mali fell under French colonial rule in 1892. By 1893, the French appointed a civilian governor of the territory they called Soudan Français'' (French Sudan), but active resistance to French rule continued. By 1905, most of the area was under firm French control.

French Sudan was administered as part of the Federation of French West Africa and supplied labor to France's colonies on the coast of West Africa. In 1958 the renamed Sudanese Republic obtained complete internal autonomy and joined the French Community. In early 1959, the Sudanese Republic and Senegal formed the Federation of Mali. On 31 March 1960 France agreed to the Federation of Mali becoming fully independent. On 20 June 1960 the Federation of Mali became an independent country and Modibo Keïta became its first President.

Independence (1960–present) 

Following the withdrawal of Senegal from the federation in August 1960, the former Sudanese Republic became the Republic of Mali on 22 September 1960, with Modibo Keïta as president.

President Modibo Keïta, whose Sudanese Union-African Democratic Rally (US/RDA) party had dominated pre-independence politics (as a member of the African Democratic Rally), moved quickly to declare a single-party state and to pursue a socialist policy based on extensive nationalization. Keïta withdrew from the French Community and also had close ties to the Eastern bloc. A continuously deteriorating economy led to a decision to rejoin the Franc Zone in 1967 and modify some of the economic excesses.

In 1962-64 there was Tuareg insurgency in northern Mali.

Under Moussa Traoré 

On November 19, 1968, a group of young officers staged a bloodless coup and set up a 14-member Military Committee for National Liberation (CMLN), with Lt. Moussa Traoré as president. The military leaders attempted to pursue economic reforms, but for several years faced debilitating internal political struggles and the disastrous Sahelian drought.

A new constitution, approved in 1974, created a one-party state and was designed to move Mali toward civilian rule. However, the military leaders remained in power. In September 1976, a new political party was established, the Democratic Union of the Malian People (UDPM), based on the concept of democratic centralism. Single-party presidential and legislative elections were held in June 1979, and Gen. Moussa Traoré received 99% of the votes. His efforts at consolidating the single-party government were challenged in 1980 by student-led anti-government demonstrations that led to three coup attempts, which were brutally quashed.

The political situation stabilized during 1981 and 1982, and remained generally calm throughout the 1980s. In late December 1985, however, a border dispute between Mali and Burkina Faso over the mineral rich Agacher strip erupted into a brief war. The UDPM spread its structure to Cercles and Arrondissements across the land.

Shifting its attention to Mali's economic difficulties, the government approved plans for some reforms of the state enterprise system, and attempted to control public corruption. It implemented cereal marketing liberalization, created new incentives to private enterprise, and worked out a new structural adjustment agreement with the International Monetary Fund (IMF). But the populace became increasingly dissatisfied with the austerity measures imposed by the IMF plan as well as their perception that the ruling elite was not subject to the same strictures. In response to the growing demands for multiparty democracy then sweeping the continent, the Traoré regime did allow some limited political liberalization. In National Assembly elections in June 1988, multiple UDPM candidates were permitted to contest each seat, and the regime organized nationwide conferences to consider how to implement democracy within the one-party framework. Nevertheless, the regime refused to usher in a full-fledged democratic system.

However, by 1990, cohesive opposition movements began to emerge, including the National Democratic Initiative Committee and the Alliance for Democracy in Mali (Alliance pour la Démocratie au Mali, ADEMA). The increasingly turbulent political situation was complicated by the rise of ethnic violence in the north in mid-1990. The return to Mali of large numbers of Tuareg who had migrated to Algeria and Libya during the prolonged drought increased tensions in the region between the nomadic Tuareg and the sedentary population. Ostensibly fearing a Tuareg secessionist movement in the north, the Traoré regime imposed a state of emergency and harshly repressed Tuareg unrest. Despite the signing of a peace accord in January 1991, unrest and periodic armed clashes continued.

2000s 
Konaré stepped down after his constitutionally mandated limit of two terms and did not run in the 2002 elections. Touré then reemerged, this time as a civilian. Running as an independent on a platform of national unity, Touré won the presidency in a runoff against the candidate of Adema, which had been divided by infighting and suffered from the creation of a spin-off party, the Rally for Mali. Touré had retained great popularity because of his role in the transitional government in 1991–92. The 2002 election was a milestone, marking Mali's first successful transition from one democratically elected president to another, despite the persistence of electoral irregularities and low voter turnout. In the 2002 legislative elections, no party gained a majority; Touré then appointed a politically inclusive government and pledged to tackle Mali's pressing social and economic development problems.

2010s

In January 2012, the National Movement for the Liberation of Azawad (MNLA) began an insurgency. Rebel troops from the military appeared on state TV on 22 March 2012 announcing they had seized control of the country, citing unrest over the president's handling of the conflict with the rebels. The former president was forced into hiding.

However, due to the 2012 insurgency in northern Mali, the military government controls only the southern third of the country, leaving the north of the country (known as Azawad) to MNLA rebels. The rebels control Timbuktu, 700 km from the capital. In response, the Economic Community of West African States (ECOWAS) froze assets and imposed an embargo, leaving some with only days of fuel. Mali is dependent on fuel imports trucked overland from Senegal and Ivory Coast.

As of July 17, 2012, the Tuareg rebels have since been pushed out by their allies, the Islamists, Ansar Dine, and Al Qaeda in the Islamic Maghreb (A.Q.I.M.). An extremist ministate in northern Mali is the unexpected result from the collapse of the earlier coup d'etat by the angry army officers.

Refugees in the 92,000-person refugee camp at Mbera, Mauritania, describe the Islamists as "intent on imposing an Islam of lash and gun on Malian Muslims." The Islamists in Timbuktu have destroyed about a half-dozen venerable above-ground tombs of revered holy men, proclaiming the tombs contrary to Shariah. One refugee in the camp spoke of encountering Afghans, Pakistanis and Nigerians.

Ramtane Lamamra, the African Union's peace and security commissioner, said the African Union has discussed sending a military force to reunify Mali and that negotiations with terrorists had been ruled out but negotiations with other armed factions is still open.

On 10 December 2012 Prime Minister Cheick Modibo Diarra was arrested by soldiers and taken to a military base in Kati. Hours later, the Prime Minister announced his resignation and the resignation of his government on national television.

On 10 January 2013, Islamist forces captured the strategic town of Konna, located 600 km from the capital, from the Malian army. The following day, the French military launched Opération Serval, intervening in the conflict.

By 8 February, the Islamist-held territory had been re-taken by the Malian military, with help from the international coalition. Tuareg separatists have continued to fight the Islamists as well, although the MNLA has also been accused of carrying out attacks against the Malian military.

A peace deal between the government and Tuareg rebels was signed on 18 June 2013.

Presidential elections were held in Mali on 28 July 2013, with a second round run-off held on 11 August. Ibrahim Boubacar Keïta defeated Soumaïla Cissé in the run-off to become the new President of Mali.

The peace deal between the Tuareg rebels and Malian government was broken in late November 2013 because of clashes in the northern city of Kidal. A new ceasefire was agreed upon on 20 February 2015 between the Malian government and the northern rebels.

In August 2018, President Ibrahim Boubacar Keita was re-elected for a new five-year term after winning the second round of the election against Soumaïla Cissé.

2020s
Since 5 June 2020 street protests calling for the resignation of President Ibrahim Boubacar Keïta began in Bamako. On 18 August 2020 mutinying soldiers arrested President Ibrahim Boubacar Keïta and Prime Minister Boubou Cissé. President Keïta resigned and left the country. The National Committee for the Salvation of the People led by Colonel Assimi Goïta took power, meaning the fourth coup happened since independence from France in 1960. On 12 September 2020, the National Committee for the Salvation of the People agreed to an 18-month political transition to civilian rule. Shortly after, Bah N'Daw was named interim president.

On May 25, 2021, Colonel Assimi Goïta dismissed the transitional president Bah N'Daw and the transitional prime minister Moctar Ouane from their positions. On 7 June 2021, Mali’s military commander Assimi Goita was sworn into office as the new interim president. According to Human Rights Watch (HRW) Malian troops and suspected Russian mercenaries from the Wagner group executed around 300 civilian men in central Mali in March 2022. France had  withdrawn French troops from Mali in February 2022.

In 2023, President Roch Marc Christian Kaboré of Burkina Faso proposed the establishment of a federation with Mali. The aim of the federation was to amplify the political and economic influence of both nations by combining their resources, territories and populations. This initiative was part of a larger trend of African countries forming regional alliances to address shared challenges and advance their collective interests. The proposal faced criticism and opposition due to concerns over cultural, historical, and economic differences between the two countries, as well as issues regarding the distribution of power and resources and potential loss of national sovereignty.

See also 
 Bamako history and timeline
 History of Africa
 History of West Africa
List of heads of government of Mali
List of heads of state of Mali
Politics of Mali
 History of Timbuktu
 Mali National Archives

References